Kate Levant (born 1983) is an American artist.

Life and education 
Kate Levant was born in 1983 in Chicago.  She attended the Francis W. Parker School (Chicago) and in high school, the Chicago Academy for the Arts. She has degrees from Yale University and the School of the Museum of Fine Arts, Boston.

Career 
Kate Levant is an American sculptor and conceptual artist. Her work has been included in the 2012 Whitney Biennial at Whitney Museum of American Art. She is represented by Monique Meloche in Chicago. Previously, she was represented by Zach Feuer Gallery in New York. She uses salvaged industrial materials, papers, aluminum foil and household items to create abstract assemblages. The concepts driving these sculptures have been described by Natalie Haddad at Hyperallergic as "systems that sustain life and society, and the consequences of their breakdown, remain at the heart of her practice." Her work has been compared to Robert Rauschenberg. Of what drives the form of her work, the artist has said, “The material, the substances and subjects themselves, seem to be what has the whip in them…I don’t feel in charge of the dynamic.”

Critical Reception 
Critics frequently mention Levant's 2009 exhibition "Blood Drive" at Zach Feuer Gallery—launched while still a graduate student at Yale University—as the launch of her career. That show consistent of a series of sculptures that included a "Waiting Area", assemblage sculptures resembling furniture, and an actual blood drive.

Kate Levant's art was included in a discussion  of work in the 2012 Whitney Biennial by Michael Wilson in Art in America. In the article, he describes her work "mourning" the loss of America's Manufacturing Industry.

Exhibitions 
2017 Use Your Indicator, Clima

2016 Which’s Ploying the Fans, Monique Meloche

2014 Reverse Leash Affect, Zach Feuer

2012 Closure of Jaw, Zach Feuer

2012 Whitney Biennial, The Whitney Museum of Art

2011 This is Laced, Zach Feuer

2009 Blood Drive: Compromised by Kate Levant, Zach Feuer

References

External links 
 http://art.newcity.com/2013/04/23/review-kate-levantmonique-meloche-gallery/
 http://nymag.com/news/intelligencer/breaking/58332/
 http://www.contemporaryartdaily.com/tag/kate-levant/

1983 births
Living people
21st-century American sculptors
American conceptual artists
Artists from Chicago
School of the Museum of Fine Arts at Tufts alumni
Yale School of Art alumni

Francis W. Parker School (Chicago) alumni